Qinghai Senke Football Club was a football club based in Xining, Qinghai, China.

History
Qinghai Senke was established as an amateur club in 2011 and finished the 7th place in the northern group final of 2011 China Amateur Football League. On 17 April 2012, the club was reorganized as a professional football club. Former China national team midfielder Song Lihui was appointed as the club's first manager. They registered to play within China League Two, third tier of the Chinese football league system in the 2012 league season.

Results
All-time league rankings

 in North Group

References

External links
Official website 

Defunct football clubs in China
Football clubs in China
2012 establishments in China
Association football clubs established in 2012
Association football clubs disestablished in 2013
Xining
Sport in Qinghai
2013 disestablishments in China